Islamic secondary rulings (Persian:احکام ثانویه) from the Shia perspective the perspective of Islam religion, are those deduced by a fully qualified jurist with due consideration for the circumstances and conditions of an individual or society. An example of this category of laws is the  issued by Mirza Mohammed Hassan Husseini Shirazi forbidding the use of Tobacco Protest.""""

The difference between the primary and secondary rulings 
The difference between the primary and secondary rulings can be explained as follows:""""
  An important point to note in connection with the secondary rulings is that they relate to the category of actions and affairs that are generally considered  or neutral. The primary rulings, on the other hand, are not changeable on any account.
  With the disappearance of the cause and motive behind the secondary rulings, their validity expires and the domain of its application returns to the sphere of primary rulings.

References 

Shia Islam